This is an alphabetical list of notable 16th–19th-century Dutch people associated with the Dutch Navy, the Dutch admiralties—the Admiralty of Amsterdam, Admiralty of Friesland, Admiralty of West Friesland, Admiralty of the Maze, and the Admiralty of Zeeland—the Dutch East India Company, and those in service of foreign navies.

During the 17th century, the Dutch Republic was a major maritime power and dominated much of the world trade during a period of intense European commercial rivalry. As such, the Dutch Navy was involved in a number of conflicts against other European powers, of which the Anglo-Dutch Wars are perhaps the best-known example. These naval battles generated numerous naval heroes, especially as the presence of no less than five Dutch admiralties ensured that many flag officers took part.

Naval personnel 

 Cort Adeler
 Jurriaen Aernoutsz
 Philips van Almonde
 Laurens Alteras
 Mårten Anckarhielm
 Joris Andringa
 Gerrit Verdooren van Asperen
 Douwe Aukes
 Hans Willem van Aylva
 Adriaen Banckert
 Joost Banckert
 Jacob Binckes
 Pieter de Bitter
 Abraham Blauvelt
 Adriaen Maertensz Block
 Johan Arnold Bloys van Treslong
 Willem Bloys van Treslong
 Willem Bontekoe
 Aegidius van Braam
 Jacob Pieter van Braam
 Jan van Brakel
 Roche Braziliano
 Joris Pieters van den Broeck
 Lodewijk van Bylandt
 Paulus van Caerden
 Gerard Callenburgh
 Theodorus Frederik van Capellen
 Hendrik Carloff
 Joris Carolus
 Jan Carstenszoon
 Anthony Colve
 Baltazar de Cordes
 Abraham Crijnssen
 Jacobus Deketh
 Pieter van der Does
 Cornelis Evertsen the Elder
 Cornelis Evertsen the Younger
 Cornelis Evertsen the Youngest
 Johan Evertsen
 Pieter Floriszoon
 Jan van Galen
 Willem Joseph van Ghent
 Isaack Gilsemans
 Lenaert Jansz de Graeff
 Hendrik Gravé
 Jacob Groenewegen
 Steven van der Hagen
 Hendrick Hamel
 Dirk Hartog
 Leendert Hasenbosch
 Jacob van Heemskerk
 Piet Pieterszoon Hein
 Boudewijn Hendricksz
 Moses Cohen Henriques
 Jacques l'Hermite
 Dooitze Eelkes Hinxt
 Frederick de Houtman
 Gerard Pietersz Hulft
 Abraham van der Hulst
 Pieter Ita
 Willem Janszoon
 Cornelis Jol
 Hendrik August van Kinckel
 Jan Hendrik van Kinsbergen
 Egbert Bartholomeusz Kortenaer
 Mooy Lambert
 Jan Lichthart
 Cornelis de Liefde
 Johan de Liefde
 Hendrick Lonck
 Engelbertus Lucas Jr.
 Engelbertus Lucas Sr.
 Willem van der Marck
 Cornelis Matelief de Jonge
 Pieter Melvill van Carnbee
 Jan Meppel
 Philip de Montmorency, Count of Horn
 Joos de Moor
 Willem Cornelisz van Muyden
 Justinus van Nassau
 Jacob Corneliszoon van Neck
 Aert Jansse van Nes
 Jan Jansse van Nes
 Olivier van Noort
 Pieter Nuyts
 Dirck Gerritsz Pomp
 Jacob Quaeckernaeck
 Laurens Reael
 Jacob Roggeveen
 Adriaen Roothaes
 Engel de Ruyter
 Michiel de Ruyter
 Jan van Ryen
 Gilles Schey
 Volckert Schram
 Cornelis Schrijver
 Herman van Speult
 Joris van Spilbergen
 Enno Doedes Star
 Auke Stellingwerf
 Samuel Story
 Jochem Swartenhont
 Isaac Sweers
 Abel Tasman
 François Thijssen
 Adrian Jorisszen Tienpoint
 Joost van Trappen Banckert
 Cornelis Tromp
 Maarten Tromp
 Carel Hendrik Ver Huell
 Pieter Willemsz Verhoeff
 Roemer Vlacq
 Willem de Vlamingh
 David Vlugh
 David Pietersz de Vries
 Hidde Sjoerds de Vries
 Tjerk Hiddes de Vries
 Maarten Gerritsz Vries
 Johannes van Walbeeck
 Jacob van Wassenaer Duivenvoorde
 Jacob van Wassenaer Obdam
 Sebald de Weert
 Abraham van der Weijden
 Jan Jansz Weltevree
 Jacob Willekens
 Jan Willem de Winter
 Witte de With
 François de Wittert
 Willem van der Zaen
 Willem de Zoete
 Johan Zoutman
 Jan van Speijk

Lists of Dutch people by occupation
Netherlands history-related lists